The Rayeen or  Raen راعین are a Muslim community found in the state of  Pakistan and india India and Trai region of Nepal. They are sub-group of the larger arain community of South Asia. They are also known  Al-Raiee.

History and origin

The community are a branch of the wider arain community. The Rayeen are big businessman in  green grocers of punjab, and North Kashmir and Uttar Pradesh widely distributed throughout Bihar. They speak Urdu, Hindi, and in the west of Bihar, Bhojpuri.

Present circumstances

The Rayee are strictly endogamous, but have no sub-divisions or gotras. They prefer marriage among a close kinship circle, and both cross cousin and parallel cousin marriages are practiced. The community are still engaged in agriculture. They are big land farmer in Pakistan and western up and panjab. Also in Kashmir|

References

Social groups of Pakistan
Muslim communities of Bihar
Muslim communities of India
Social groups of Bihar
Indian castes